Çukurabanoz is a village in Anamur district of Mersin Province, Turkey. It is situated in the  Taurus Mountains,. A remote neighbourhood of the village to the east of Çukurabanoz is known as Abanoz. Abanoz has no settled population and it is the yayla (resort) of Anamur residents. The population of Çukurabanoz is 173  as of 2011.

References

Villages in Anamur District